Miguel Ángel Monsalve Gonzáles (born 27 February 2004) is a Colombian footballer who currently plays as a midfielder for Independiente Medellín. He was included in The Guardian's "Next Generation" list for 2021.

Career statistics

Club

Notes

References

2004 births
Living people
Footballers from Medellín
Colombian footballers
Association football midfielders
Independiente Medellín footballers
Categoría Primera A players